The Peace and Security Council (PSC) is the organ of the African Union in charge of enforcing union decisions. It is patterned somewhat after the United Nations Security Council. The PSC is also the main pillar of the African Peace and Security Architecture (APSA), and works with other pillars of the APSA in order to promote "peace, security and stability in Africa". The specific goal of the Peace and Security Council (PSC) is the "prevention, management and resolution of conflicts". To achieve these goals, it involves subsidiary organizations such as the Military Staff Committee and the Committee of Experts.

Members are elected by the African Union Executive Council and endorsed by the Assembly of the African Union so as to reflect regional balance within Africa, as well as a variety of other criteria, including capacity to contribute militarily and financially to the union, political will to do so, and effective diplomatic presence at Addis Ababa.

The council is composed of fifteen countries, of which five are elected to three-year terms, and ten to two-year terms. Countries are immediately re-eligible upon the expiration of their terms.

History

Background 
In the early 1990s, members of the Organization of African Unity (OAU), the predecessor to the African Union (AU), decided to abstain from active peacekeeping operations and focus instead on "preventive diplomacy". However, they reevaluated their stances after conflicts in Rwanda and Burundi.

In 1995, members of the OAU started to support the use of peacekeeping operations after a summit in Addis Ababa. However, the OAU still prioritized preventive diplomacy and believed that the United Nations should shoulder most of the responsibility for organizing peacekeeping operations.

Later conflicts in Africa were largely mediated by African institutions rather than the UN. For example, conflicts in Liberia and Sierra Leone were addressed by the Economic Community of West African States. Similarly, conflicts in Lesotho and the Democratic Republic of Congo were addressed by the Southern African Development Community.

These sub-regional organizations' large role in addressing regional conflicts led to a debate about the effectiveness of the OAU. Members specifically wished to reform the OAU's focus on consensus-based meetings rather than on-the-ground action, since some conflicts' actors were part of the meetings and could interfere with their judgement. Similarly, the large size of the OAU, its consensus decision-making and its lack of clear procedures both obstructed constructive debate. However, on-the-ground interventions were also limited by the OAU's non-interventionist principles, which only allowed domestic military intervention with the state's consent.

Thus, in 2001, an OAU Assembly session moved to reform the OAU's mechanisms in a new institution: the African Union. The new African Union was designed to center around a central decision-making organ with concrete rules, a smaller membership of 15 states to facilitate decision-making, majority rather than consensus-based decision-making, and viable options to recommend military intervention to the African Union Assembly. After some debate, this decision-making organ was coined the Peace and Security Council, and its rules were outlined in the Protocol Relating to the Establishment of the Peace and Security Council.

Protocol Relating to the Establishment of the Peace and Security Council 
Adopted in July 2002, the Protocol was later ratified by a majority of AU members in December 2003. Within the Protocol's text, the institutional design, subsidiary committees, powers and goals of the PSC were outlined.

Specifically, its Objectives were stated in Article 3, and its Principles were stated in Article 4. When outlining its Principles, the Protocol cites three inspirations: "the [AU's] Constitutive Act, the Charter of the United Nations and the Universal Declaration of Human Rights".

In Article 5, the Protocol details the PSC's membership structure and membership criteria.

Article 8 outlines the PSC's procedural rules, including rules for voting, organizing meetings and creating subsidiary bodies.

Specific subcommittees that support the PSC, such as the Panel of the Wise, the Continental Early Warning System, and the African Standby Force are detailed in Articles 11, 12 and 13, respectively.

Finally, the Protocol outlines the PSC's relationship with regional bodies in Article 16, and relationship with international organizations, especially the UN, in Article 17.

Organization

Meetings 
There are three levels of PSC meetings: meetings between permanent representatives, meetings between ministers, and meetings between heads of state. Permanent representative meetings meet at least twice a month, whereas the other two levels meet at least once per year.

Until 2007, there were three types of meetings: formal meetings, briefing sessions and consultations. In formal meetings, members discuss AU Commission reports, which often concern brewing conflicts. In briefing sessions, PSC staff briefs members on various subject areas and themes, such as terrorism and development. In consultation meetings, PSC members work to gather various actors and develop an understanding of a certain issue.

After a brainstorming session in July 2007, the PSC instead chose to meet under four types of meetings: public meetings, closed meetings, consultations and "Arria-type" meetings. In "Arria-type" meetings, PSC members meet with non-state actors and carry out informal discussions.

As of 2016, the PSC has held over 600 meetings.

Chairperson of the Commission 
Every month, a new chairperson is selected from the PSC members. This selection cycles through the alphabetical order of the PSC's member country names, in English.

Members
Although the PSC was partly inspired by the United Nations Security Council, unlike the UNSC, the PSC does not have any permanent members or veto power. All 15 members have equal power in the Council. Ten members are elected for two years and five members are elected for three years. Members are elected to represent Africa's regional distribution. In order, each potential member must meet certain criteria. These criteria are outlined in Article five of the Protocol Relating to the Establishment of the Peace and Security Council.

Each term starts from the date of the 1st of April and ends on the date of the 31st of March. As of April 2020, the following countries occupy the seats of the PSC:

Role

Mission 
The mission of the PSC is to respond to conflicts in Africa. The PSC relies on collective security and its early warning detection systems. Article 3 of the Relating to the Establishment of the Peace and Security Council expands upon the PSC's objectives.

Powers 
Article 7 of the Protocol Relating to the Establishment of the Peace and Security Council lists the PSC's power.

Some of these powers include undertaking "peace-making and peace-building functions to resolve conflicts", recommending intervention to the AU Assembly in "grave circumstances, namely war crimes, genocide and crimes against humanity", promoting a close relationship with regional bodies as well as with the United Nations, facilitating humanitarian action and finally, deciding "on any other issue having implications for the maintenance of peace, security and stability on the Continent".

Peace support missions 
The following peace support operations have been conducted under an AU mandate, or with AU authorisation:
 
 African Union Mission in Burundi (AMIB) – 2003 to 2004
 AU mandated 2 April 2003 (for a period of 12 months); deployed 27 April 2003 to 31 May 2004 when the mission was succeeded by a UN mission. The Head of Mission and Special Representative of the Chairperson of the AU Commission was Ambassador Mamadou Bah (Guinea).  The Force Commander of AMIB’s military component was Major-General Sipho Binda (South Africa), while his deputy, Brigadier-General G. Ayele, was from Ethiopia.
 African Union Mission in Sudan (AMIS) – 2004 to 2007
 African Union Military Observer Mission in the Comoros (MIOC) - 2004
 African Union Mission for Support to the Elections in Comoros (AMISEC) – 2006
 African Union Mission in Somalia (AMISOM) – 2007 to present
 On 20 February 2007 the UN Security Council adopted SC Resolution 1744, which authorised AMISOM’s deployment.
 African Union Electoral and Security Assistance Mission to the Comoros (MAES) – 2007 to 2008
 African Union/ United Nations Hybrid Mission (UNAMID) - 2008 to present
 On 31 July 2007 UN Security Council Resolution 1769 (UNSC 2007) established the AU/ UN Hybrid Operation in Darfur, also referred to as UNAMID.
 Regional Cooperation Initiative for the Elimination of the Lord’s Resistance Army (RCI-LRA) – 2011 to 2017
 Authorised by the AU Peace and Security Council in November 2011.
 African-led International Support Mission to Mali (AFISMA) – 2013
 African-led Support Mission to the Central African Republic (MISCA) – 2013 to 2014
 A regional peace support mission - the Mission for the consolidation of peace in Central African Republic (MICOPAX) - was deployed in 2008 under the leadership of the Economic Community of Central African States (ECCAS).  But a new crisis erupted in 2012-2013, when Séléka forces seized the capital Bangui.  In response, on 19 July 2013, the AU Peace and Security Council approved the deployment of MISCA. The transfer of authority between ECCAS/MICOPAX and the AU/MISCA mission took place on 19 December 2013.  The mission ended with the transfer of authority from MISCA to the UN mission MINUSCA on 15 September 2014.
 Multinational Joint Task Force (MNJTF) – 2015 to present
 Regional Protection Force – 2017 to present
During July 2016 the AU agreed to a Regional Protection Force to bolster the UN mission in South Sudan, similar to the United Nations Force Intervention Brigade role with the MONUSCO mission in the Democratic Republic of the Congo UN Security Council resolution 2304 adopted on 12 August 2016 approved the deployment of a Regional Protection Force to the UN Mission in South Sudan to provide a secure environment in and around Juba.  Rwandan troops deployed during 2017 as part of the proposed force, but there has been little subsequent news of this force and it appears it may have been merely absorbed into the larger UN mission. It included a Bangladeshi engineer company and a Nepalese company in addition to a Rwandan mechanised infantry battalion, so cannot be said to be an African force.

The following operations were authorized but never resulted in deployment:

 During December 2015 the PSC authorised a force of up to 5000 troops to be deployed to Burundi for six months to help restore order following an outbreak of politically-inspired violence. However, the African Prevention and Protection Mission in Burundi (MAPROBU) was not welcomed by the Government of Burundi and never deployed to the troubled country.

Criticism 
Some AU members criticized the PSC Protocol for being vague on which institution has the "primary legal authority" to use military force; in Article 16, the PSC Protocol states that the AU has "the primary responsibility for promoting peace, security and stability in Africa" whereas in Article 17, the Protocol states that the UN Security Council "has the primary responsibility for the maintenance of international peace and security".

Ben Kioko, the African Union's legal adviser, argued that "[some African] leaders have shown themselves willing to push the frontiers of collective stability and security to the limit without any regard for legal niceties such as the authorization of the [United Nations] Security Council".

Later in 2005, African Union members acknowledged the Security Council's authority on military use, as demonstrated in a meeting roadmap which promised that the AU would first get Security Council authorization before carrying out military interventions.

Some officials within the PSC have also argued that the PSC should broaden its scope beyond traditional military threats to security, and also address nontraditional threats such as disease and climate change.

Conversely, others question the political will of PSC and AU members to follow the PSC protocol and carry out military interventions against other members without their consent in cases of mass human rights abuses. Furthermore, the PSC relies on regional bodies contributing funds or troops for operations, but many regional bodies do not have enough resources to meet these standards.

When electing members into the PSC itself, critics have noted that members who were actively disobeying AU decisions or carrying out human rights violations within their borders have still been admitted into the Council because the Assembly of the African Union Heads of State did not properly evaluate the potential members' compliance to the PSC membership criteria.

References

Bibliography

External links
Peace and Security Council website
Protocol Relating to the Establishment of the Peace and Security Council of the African Union (pdf), 9 July 2002 (HTML version)

Organs of the African Union
Intergovernmental organizations established by treaty
Organizations established in 2003
2003 establishments in Africa